The Women's artistic individual all-around competition at the 2014 Commonwealth Games was held on July 30 at the SSE Hydro.

Qualification

Qualification took place on July 28 and 29 as part of the team and individual qualification event.

Final Results

References 
Glasgow 2014 - Women's All-around Final

Gymnastics at the 2014 Commonwealth Games
2014 in women's gymnastics